Yle Sámi Radio is a regional unit of the Finnish Broadcasting Company (Yle) that produces radio news for the Sámi people. The first regular radio programs in Sámi were broadcast in fall 1947. Sámi Radio has journalists in Inari, Utsjoki and Karesuvanto.

Yle Sámi Radio is broadcast in the northernmost region of Finnish Lapland.

See also 
NRK Sápmi
Sameradion

External links
Yle Sámi Radio

Yle radio stations
Sámi culture
Sámi in Finland
Radio stations established in 1947
1947 establishments in Finland